The Chinese Skating Association (CSA) was founded in 1956. It hosts the annual Chinese Figure Skating Championships and the Cup of China.

Notable people in Chinese figure skating

Yao Bin & Luan Bo Pairs team now coaches - first Chinese pair skaters at a Winter Olympics
Chen Lu - singles skater - first Chinese world champion figure skater
Guo Zhengxin - singles skater - first man to  land two quads in a free skate
Zhang Min - singles skater
Li Chenjiang - singles skater
Shen Xue & Zhao Hongbo - First Chinese skaters to win Olympic Gold

ISU Events Hosted by China
In 2003 the Cup of China became a Grand Prix event sanctioned by the International Skating Union.

Annual - Cup of China, National Senior and Junior Championships
Special - 2010-2011 Grand Prix Final

Focus on Jumps

In the 1990s Yao Bin focused on the throw quad salchow for his pairs students like Shen and Zhao. Chinese men like Guo Zhengxin,
Li Chenjiang, Xusheng Yu and Zhang Min focused on such jumps as the quad salchow and quad toe loop.

Age controversy
In February 2011, pairs skaters Sui Wenjing and Han Cong's ages became the subject of controversy. Although his ISU bio lists Han as born on August 6, 1992, a Chinese website suggests he was born in March 1989. This would mean that during the 2010-11 season he is too old for junior events. His partner's age also came under scrutiny. Her ISU bio states that she was born on July 18, 1995 but the Chinese website suggests she was born on May 7, 1997, making her 12 and thus, too young to compete in junior events during the 2009–10 season, including the 2010 World Junior Championships, as well as senior Grand Prix events during the 2010–11 season.

References

External links
 https://web.archive.org/web/20120404032423/http://www.chinaculture.org/gb/en_chinaway/2003-09/24/content_31824.htm 
 https://web.archive.org/web/20090218144302/http://chnfs.org/index2.htm

China
Figure skating
Organizations based in Beijing
Sport in Beijing
Figure skating in China
1956 establishments in China
1956 in figure skating
Sports organizations established in 1956